Geukensia is a genus of marine bivalve mollusc in the Mytilidae family, naturally found in the western Atlantic.

Species
Species within the genus Geukensia include:
 Geukensia demissa (Dillwyn, 1817)  - Ribbed mussel
 Geukensia granosissima (G. B. Sowerby III, 1914)  - Southern ribbed mussel

References

Mytilidae